The Guanyin of Mount Xiqiao is a colossal statue of Guanyin, on Mount Xiqiao, in Nanhai District of Foshan, Guangdong, China.

See also
 List of tallest statues

References

External links
Image

Outdoor sculptures in China
Monuments and memorials in China
Tourist attractions in Guangdong
Religious buildings and structures in Guangdong
Colossal Guanyin statues
Buildings and structures in Foshan